Family Affair is a documentary film directed by Chico Colvard, exploring a history of abuse that had gone on inside his family, as a child. The movie was produced by Chico Colvard and Liz Garbus. It opened theatrically in Los Angeles on July 30, 2010 and opened in New York City on August 13, 2010 at the 14th Annual DocuWeeks. The film is a joint venture between OWN: Oprah Winfrey Network and Discovery Communications.

References

External links
 Official Website 
 Official Facebook Page
 
 
 
 
 Yahoo! Movies
 IMP Awards

2010 films
American documentary films
2010 documentary films
Documentary films about child abuse
Incest in film
Autobiographical documentary films
Documentary films about families
2010s English-language films
2010s American films